Dashtuiyeh (also Romanized as Dashtū’īyeh and Dashtoo’eyeh; also known as Dashtū and Borj-e Dashtū) is a village in Borj-e Akram Rural District, in the Central District of Fahraj County, Kerman Province, Iran. At the 2006 census, its population was 684, in 136 families.

References 

Populated places in Fahraj County